Cepki is a small settlement between Dekani and Rižana in the City Municipality of Koper in the Littoral region of Slovenia.

References

External links

Cepki on Geopedia

Populated places in the City Municipality of Koper